The Neualmbach, also called Neualpbach, is a river which lies in its entire course on the border between Bavaria, Germany and Tyrol, Austria, in the Ammergau Alps.

The Neualmbach is the right headwater of the Linder.

See also
List of rivers of Austria
List of rivers of Bavaria

References

Rivers of Bavaria
Rivers of Tyrol (state)
Ammergau Alps
Rivers of Austria
Rivers of Germany
Austria–Germany border
International rivers of Europe
Border rivers